Ness is a village on the Wirral Peninsula, in the part that remains in the ceremonial county of Cheshire, England. It is situated near to the town of Neston, in the unitary authority of Cheshire West and Chester. It constitutes part of the Burton & Ness Ward of the district, with the ward having a total population of 1,620 in the 2001 Census.

Local attraction Ness Botanic Gardens opened in 1898 and is now administered by the University of Liverpool.

Lord Nelson's mistress, Emma Hamilton, was born in Ness.

The Errington Baronetcy, of Ness in the County Palatine of Chester, was created in the Baronetage of the United Kingdom on 26 June 1963 for the barrister and Conservative politician Eric Errington. The present holder of the title is the 3rd Baronet of Ness, Sir Robin Davenport Errington, Bt.

See also
Listed buildings in Neston

References

External links

 Ness Botanic Gardens

Villages in Cheshire
Neston